Bowlegs Creek is a stream in Polk County, Florida, in the United States.

Bowlegs Creek was named in honor of Billy Bowlegs, a Seminole chief.

See also
List of rivers of Florida

References

Rivers of Polk County, Florida
Rivers of Florida